Deungchon-dong is a dong, neighbourhood of Gangseo-gu in Seoul, South Korea.

Attractions
Jin Air has its headquarters in Deungchon-dong.

SBS Open Hall, located in Deungchon-dong, is the broadcast and recording centre of many Seoul Broadcasting System programmes with a studio audience, including the live weekly music show The Music Trend.

See also 

Administrative divisions of South Korea

References

External links
Gangseo-gu official website
 Gangseo-gu map at the Gangseo-gu official website
 Dong Resident offices of Gangseo-gu

Neighbourhoods of Gangseo District, Seoul